δ Doradus (often Latinised to Delta Doradus, abbreviated to δ Dor or delta Dor) is a star in the southern constellation of Dorado. Based upon an annual parallax shift of 21.80 mas as seen from Earth, it is located around 150 light years from the Sun. The star is visible to the naked eye with an apparent visual magnitude of +4.34.

This is an A-type main sequence star with a stellar classification of A7 V. The star is spinning rapidly with a projected rotational velocity of 172 km/s. This is giving the star an oblate shape with an equatorial bulge that is 12% larger than the polar radius. Although A-type stars are not expected to harbor a magnetic dynamo needed to power X-ray emission, an X-ray flux of  has been detected at these coordinates. This may indicate that the star has an unseen companion. δ Doradus displays an infrared excess suggesting it may be a Vega-like star with an orbiting debris disk.

Currently this star is the Moon's south pole star, which occurs once every 18.6 years. The pole star status changes periodically, because of the precession of the Moon's rotational axis. When δ Doradus is the pole star, it is better aligned than Earth's Polaris (α Ursae Minoris), but much fainter. It is also the south pole star of Jupiter.

References

External links
 http://server6.wikisky.org/starview?object_type=1&object_id=951&object_name=%CE%B4+Dor&locale=EN

A-type main-sequence stars
Circumstellar disks
Southern pole stars
Orbit of the Moon
Dorado (constellation)
Doradus, Delta
Durchmusterung objects
039014
027100
2015